Camden, California may refer to:
Camden, Fresno County, California
Camden, Sacramento County, California, a neighborhood in Elk Grove, California